Harper Independent School District is a public school district based in the community of Harper. Located in Gillespie County, the district extends into portions of Kerr and Kimble counties.

Harper ISD has three campuses - Harper High (Grades 9-12), Harper Middle (Grades 6-8), and Harper Elementary (Grades PK-5).

In 2009, the school district was rated "recognized" by the Texas Education Agency. In 2010, the school district was rated "exemplary"  by the Texas Education Agency.

References

External links
Harper ISD

School districts in Gillespie County, Texas
School districts in Kerr County, Texas
School districts in Kimble County, Texas